Below are the squads for the 24th Arabian Gulf Cup in Qatar in 2019.

Group A

Qatar
Coach:  Félix Sánchez Bas

United Arab Emirates
Coach:  Bert van Marwijk

Yemen
Coach:  Sami Hasan Al Nash

Iraq
Coach:  Srecko Katanec

Group B

Oman
Coach:  Erwin Koeman

Saudi Arabia
Coach:  Herve Renard

Kuwait
Coach:  Thamer Enad

Bahrain
Coach:  Hélio Sousa

References

External links
 Official site

squads
International association football competitions hosted by Qatar